The Official Opposition Shadow Cabinet in Canada is composed of members of the main Opposition party responsible for holding the Government to account and for developing and disseminating the party's policy positions. Members of the Official Opposition are generally referred to as Opposition Critics, but the term Shadow Minister (which is generally used in other Westminster systems) is also used.

By Member 
Following the 41st Canadian general election, held on May 2, 2011, the New Democratic Party replaced the Liberal Party of Canada as the Official Opposition in the 41st Parliament. 83 MPs have served in the Official Opposition Cabinet in the 41st Parliament. Highlight indicates Member was a Senior Shadow Minister at dissolution.

Composition
Party leader Jack Layton announced his first Shadow Cabinet as Leader of the Opposition on May 26, 2011. Layton went on a leave of absence beginning July 28, 2011, in order to fight a new cancer and Nycole Turmel was appointed interim leader. Jack Layton died August 22, 2011.

Thomas Mulcair was elected leader of the NDP, and by extension Leader of the Opposition, at a leadership election held on March 24, 2012, and reshuffled the Shadow Cabinet on April 19, 2012. Craig Scott replaced Joe Comartin as Democratic Reform critic after the latter became Deputy Speaker in September 2012. On January 17, 2013, Mulcair replaced Hoang Mai with Murray Rankin as National Revenue critic. The shadow cabinet was last shuffled on March 20, 2014.

See also
New Democratic Party Shadow Cabinet of the 40th Parliament of Canada
Liberal Party Shadow Cabinet of the 41st Parliament of Canada
Bloc Québécois Shadow Cabinet of the 41st Parliament of Canada
Cabinet of Canada
Official Opposition (Canada)
Official Opposition Shadow Cabinet (British Columbia)
Shadow Cabinet

References

Canadian shadow cabinets
History of the New Democratic Party (Canada)